Fairfax is a village in Hamilton County, Ohio, United States. It is a suburb of Cincinnati. The population was 1,768 at the 2020 census.

History
Fairfax incorporated as a village in 1955 to head off annexation from neighboring Cincinnati, but remained connected to Columbia Township after incorporating. On January 1, 2010, it withdrew from Columbia Township by forming a paper township, due in part to city residents' low tax contribution compared to their influence on township elections.

Geography

The village is bordered by the City of Cincinnati to the north, west, and south, the Village of Mariemont to the east and south, and Columbia Township to the south. Fairfax borders four City of Cincinnati neighborhoods: Madisonville to the north, Hyde Park and Mount Lookout to the west, and Linwood to the south.

Little Duck Creek runs through Fairfax eventually making it's way to larger Duck Creek and the nearby Little Miami River which feeds into the Ohio River. Little Duck Creek splits the village into what residents refer to as "Lower Fairfax", and "Upper Fairfax". Lower Fairfax is a low lying area in the northeast residential portion of the village that has frequently flooded via the creek during heavy rains which has resulted in multiple fatalities. The village has purchased and demolished homes in Lower Fairfax utilizing federal funds to mitigate flood damages.

Demographics

2020 Census
At the 2020 census there were 1,768 people living in the village. The racial makeup of the village was 89.4% White alone, 2.1% Black or African American, 0.3% Native American, 1.5% Asian, 0.8% from other races, and 5.8% from two or more races.

2010 Census
At the 2010 census there were 1,699 people, 709 households, and 455 families living in the village. The racial makeup of the village was 94.8% White, 2.4% African American, 0.3% Native American, 0.8% Asian, 0.1% from other races, and 1.6% from two or more races. Hispanic or Latino of any race were 1.3%.

Of the 709 households 34.4% had children under the age of 18 living with them, 41.9% were married couples living together, 16.8% had a female householder with no husband present, 5.5% had a male householder with no wife present, and 35.8% were non-families. 29.5% of households were one person and 9.8% were one person aged 65 or older. The average household size was 2.40 and the average family size was 2.97.

The median age in the village was 37.7 years. 24.4% of residents were under the age of 18; 6.9% were between the ages of 18 and 24; 29.6% were from 25 to 44; 27.8% were from 45 to 64; and 11.4% were 65 or older. The gender makeup of the village was 46.5% male and 53.5% female.

Education
Fairfax feeds into the Mariemont City School District, which includes Mariemont High School. Mariemont Junior High School is the only school in the district that sits within the village Mariemont Junior High School.

References

External links
 

Villages in Hamilton County, Ohio
Villages in Ohio